Anne-Lise Børresen-Dale (born 3 July 1946 in Molde) is a Norwegian biochemist. She is a senior scientist at Oslo University Hospital and Professor of molecular tumor biology at the University of Oslo. She received the 2002 Nordic Medical Prize.
In 2015 she received the Fritjof Nansen medal and award for Outstanding Research from the Norwegian Academy of Science and Letters, and in 2017 she was appointed to Commander of the Royal Norwegian St. Olavs Order  by the King of Norway.

She holds an M.Sc. in biochemistry from NTNU (1970), a D.Sc. in medical biochemical genetics from the University of Oslo (1978) and was awarded full professor competence in gene technology in 1987. She was employed at the Institute of Medical Genetics at the University of Oslo from 1970 as a research assistant, research fellow, senior research fellow and head of section. From 1987 she was a senior scientist at the Department of Genetics at the Norwegian Radium Hospital, and since 1999 she has also been head of department. She has additionally been Professor of molecular tumor biology at the University of Oslo since 1992.

Honours
King Olav V's Prize for Cancer Research, 1994
Member of the Royal Norwegian Society of Sciences and Letters, 1998
Honorary member of the Norwegian Biochemical Society, 2001
Research Prize of the University of Oslo, 2002
Nordic Medical Prize, 2002
Member of the Norwegian Academy of Science and Letters, 2004
Swiss Bridge Award for outstanding Cancer Research, 2004
Honorary doctorate in medicine (dr.med. h.c.), University of Copenhagen, 2008
Möbius Prize of the Research Council of Norway, 2008
Member of the European Academy of Cancer Sciences, 2009
Honorary ambassador of the Norwegian Cancer Society, 2010
Honorary member of The Hungarian Cancer Society, 2012
Helmholtz International Fellow Award, Germany, 2014
European Journal of Surgical Oncology Award Lecture, 2014
Elena Timofeeff-Ressovsky Lecturer, Berlin, 2015
Mildred Scheel Lecturer, Germany, 2015
Fritjof Nansen medal and award for Outstanding Research, 2015
Oslo University Hospital's Excellent Researcher Award, 2015 
The AACR Distinguished Lectureship in Breast Cancer Research, 2015
AACR-Women in Cancer Research Charlotte Friend Memorial Lectureship and award, 2017
Commander of the Royal Norwegian St. Olavs Order, 2017

References

1946 births
Living people
Norwegian biochemists
Oslo University Hospital people
Members of the Norwegian Academy of Science and Letters
Royal Norwegian Society of Sciences and Letters